Raining Stones is a 1993 film directed by Ken Loach and starring Bruce Jones, Julie Brown, Ricky Tomlinson, Tom Hickey and Gemma Phoenix. It tells the story of a man who cannot afford to buy his daughter a First Communion dress, and makes disastrous choices in trying to raise the money. The film won the Jury Prize at the 1993 Cannes Film Festival.

Plot

England is in the midst of a depression with crushing unemployment. Bob and his best friend Tommy engage in all manner of schemes to make money, including stealing sheep to sell to local butchers, tearing up sod from government buildings to re-sell, and cleaning out bathroom pipes. Bob's wife Anne tries to help, but doesn't have marketable skills (having been let go from a seamstress factory for not knowing how to sew). Despite their best efforts, they are unable to make any job stick or get ahead of their debt. Despite their tenuous financial condition, Bob plans to buy a brand new outfit for his daughter Coleen's First Communion, even though doing so is prohibitively costly.

Eventually, Bob secretly gets a loan so he can afford Coleen's outfit and party. He's unable to pay it back, so the lender sells the debt to a vicious local loan shark, who forces his way into the house while Bob is out, steals Anne's jewelry, and makes numerous threats that he will injure Coleen if he's not paid soon. When Bob gets home, he's outraged at the trauma the loan shark inflicted on his family. He confronts the loan shark in a parking garage outside of a bar. The pair get into a fight and the loan shark beats Bob up and threatens to do even worse. However, as the loan shark begins driving off, Bob smashes his windshield with a wrench. This causes the drunken loan shark to lose control of the vehicle and smash into a column, killing the loan shark. Bob grabs the notebook containing all delinquent accounts from the loan shark's pocket, and flees into the night.

Bob runs to the local church, where he tells the priest what happened and vows to turn himself into the police. The kindhearted Priest tells Bob not to turn himself in, noting that Bob didn't kill the loan shark himself and, indeed, many neighborhood folks will now be relieved. He commands Bob to pray for the loan shark's rotten soul, and burns the account book.

The next day, Bob attends Communion as Coleen is adorable in her new outfit. Despite it being a wonderful day, Bob is shown being withdrawn and nervous, still feeling guilty about what he's done.

Cast
 Anne Marti - Anne Martin
Bruce Jones – Bob
 Julie Brown – Anne
 Gemma Phoenix – Coleen
 Ricky Tomlinson – Tommy
 Tom Hickey – Father Barry
 Mike Fallon – Jimmy
 Ronnie Ravey – Butcher
 Lee Brennan – Irishman
 Karen Henthorn – Young Mother
 Christine Abbott – May
 Geraldine Ward – Tracey
 William Ash – Joe
 Matthew Clucas – Sean
 Anna Jaskolka – Shop Assistant
 Jonathan James – Tansey
 Ken Strath - Councillor Strath

Reception
The film has been given universal critical acclaim and holds a rating of 100% on Rotten Tomatoes. It won the prestigious Grand Prix of the Belgian Syndicate of Cinema Critics.

The film opened on 8 October 1993 in the United Kingdom on 11 screens and grossed £37,211 for the weekend, finishing in 13th place at the UK box office. It went on to gross £256,636 in the UK.

Year-end lists 
 Honorable mention – Kenneth Turan, Los Angeles Times

Filming locations

 Raining Stones was shot in and around the Langley Estate in Middleton, Greater Manchester.
 Bob Williams' flat – as well as the butcher's shop in the opening scenes – were opposite the junction of Wood Street and Windemere Road.
 The pub from the car park of which Bob's Transit van was stolen was The Falcon on the corner of Threlkeld Road and Bowness Road. The Falcon has since been demolished and the site remains undeveloped as of 2010.

References

External links
 
 

1993 comedy-drama films
1993 films
Films directed by Ken Loach
Films scored by Stewart Copeland
British comedy-drama films
Films shot in Greater Manchester
1990s English-language films
1990s British films